Ronald Wolfe may refer to:

 Ronald Wolfe (screenwriter) (1920–2011), British TV scriptwriter
 Ronald Wolfe (rapist) (died 1964), last person executed in the United States for non-homicidal rape

See also
Ron Wolf, American football general manager
Ron DeWolfe, critic of Scientology
Ronald de Wolf, computer scientist